Survivor Japan: Hokkaido, was the second season of Survivor Japan and it aired from July 2, 2002 to September 17, 2002. This season was set in Mikasa, Hokkaidō of Japan. The original tribes were named Toytoy (トイトイ, Toitoi) and Wakka (ワッカ, Wakka), and merged tribe was named Nitay (ニタイ, Nitai). In Reward Challenges during the tribal stage of the game, each tribe had to bet specified goods from their tribes camp. The defeated tribe had to give their goods to the winning tribe. Prior to the merge, both tribes had to burn their camp down, and to move to a new camp site. Ultimately, it was convenience store clerk Asami Kawamura won the season by a jury vote of 6-0 over maid Sakiko Sekiguchi.

Finishing order

Voting history

 As Fumio and Takako both received two votes at the fifth tribal council, the number of votes each had received at previous tribal councils was taken into account. Takako had two previous votes but Fumio had three, therefore Fumio was eliminated.

External links
http://www.geocities.co.jp/Milkyway-Lynx/9948/index1.html
http://www.h4.dion.ne.jp/~seiya-mu/survivor/survivor2.ja.episode.html
https://web.archive.org/web/20040615142943/http://www.tbs.co.jp/survivor/2/digest-01.html

Japan
Japanese game shows
Television shows filmed in Japan